Metal Female Voices Fest was a heavy metal music festival dedicated to female vocalists, held annually in the Oktoberhallen in Wieze, Belgium from 2003 to 2016. It was organized by the Metal Organisation, which later changed into "2 Wild 4 agency". The festival enables smaller and unknown bands within the female fronted genre to perform on a big stage beside bigger and more famous bands.

Over the years, they gave away special awards or organized a warm-up which allowed bands to compete to perform on the festival for the next year.

On 13 February 2017, it was announced that the Metal Female Voices Fest is put on indefinite hold. On 10 December 2018, it has been confirmed that a Japanese edition of MFVF will take place in Osaka and Tokyo in April 2019.

In 2020, the official website of the Metal Female Voices Fest went dead.

Lineups

2019

Japan
 Leaves' Eyes
 Anneke van Giersbergen's VUUR
 Mary's Blood (Tokyo only)
 Evig Natt
 Sailing to Nowhere
 Ancient Myth (Osaka only)
 Rakshasa (Osaka only)
 Eleanor (Tokyo only)

2017

"On hold"

2016

2014

2013

2012

2011

2010

2009
The seventh edition took place at Oktoberhallen in Wieze in the municipality of Lebbeke on October 17 and October 18, 2009.

2008

2007
Theatre of Tragedy, who had already pulled out of the 2006 festival, were initially scheduled to perform on October 20 as the fifth band on the bill. On February 2 it was announced that they had decided to cancel their appearance, with no explanation given. They were replaced by Autumn. The Gathering and After Forever also canceled, respectively on February 15, being replaced by Delain, and May 4, being replaced by Flowing Tears. The lineup was later reshuffled so Sirenia and Epica ended up taking After Forever and The Gathering's place. Darzamat, Autumn and Imperia also pulled out shortly before the date of the festival.

†Held at Ten Weyngaert, Brussels. / ‡Held at Oktoberhallen, Wieze.

2006
Held on October 21 at Oktoberhallen in Wieze. Theatre of Tragedy canceled their appearance on October 20 because two band members were sick. Delain were initially going to play as a special guest, but they effectively replaced Theatre of Tragedy in the lineup. The event was also dedicated to the late Elis singer, Sabine Dünser, who passed on July of that year. The remaining members of Elis were in attendance at the festival and had performed the year prior at the event.

2005

Held at Oktoberhallen, Wieze.

2004

Held at Ancienne Belgique, Brussels.

2003

Held at Ten Weyngaert, Forest.

References

Pictures of the edition of 2007. www.metal-ways.com.

External links
Official website

Music festivals in Belgium
Heavy metal festivals in Belgium

Autumn events in Belgium
Lebbeke